Renwick  may refer to:
Places
 Renwick, Cumbria, England
 Renwick, Iowa, United States
 Renwick, New South Wales, Australia
 Renwick, New York, United States, see List of places in New York: R
 Renwick, New Zealand
People
 Sir Arthur Renwick (1837–1908), Australian physician, politician and philanthropist
 Clan Renwick of Scotland
 Rev Prof Alexander M. Renwick (1888–1965) Moderator of the General Assembly of the Free Church of Scotland in 1931
 David Renwick (born 1951), writer and creator of the BBC TV sitcom One Foot in the Grave
 Ed Renwick (1938–2020), Louisiana political scientist and political commentator
 A number of people named James Renwick
 John "Renny" Renwick, a fictional character from the Doc Savage book series
  (1954–2006), French voice actor
 Robert Renwick, 1st Baron Renwick (1904–1973), British industrialist and public servant
 Renwick Baronets
 Baron Renwick
 Robbie Renwick (born 1988), Scottish swimmer
 Renwick Williams, known as "The Monster", charged with various assaults in 1790

Other
 The Renwick Gallery in Washington, DC, United States